Elena Bianchini-Cappelli (1873 – September 19, 1919) was an Italian dramatic soprano opera singer.

Early life
Elena Bianchini-Cappelli was from Rome. She studied voice with Guglielmo Vergine in Naples, while he was also teaching Enrico Caruso.

Career

She appeared with Caruso in 1895, in Cavalleria Rusticana at Caserta. The pair also appeared together in Puccini's Manon Lescaut in Cairo in 1895; the two were only given five days to learn the show before opening night, so Caruso fastened the score to Bianchini-Cappelli's back, limiting her stage movement: "I was helpless to do more than hold as still as possible, serving as a human music rack for my comrade," she recalled. "And what did the rascal do? He was bursting to laugh!"

In 1899 she was in the cast of Wagner's Siegfried at La Scala. She was in the cast of Verdi's Un ballo in maschera when it was conducted by Arturo Toscanini at Trento. She first performed in the United States in 1902, the year she sang "Sylvia" in Zanetto at the Metropolitan Opera House, under the direction of composer Pietro Mascagni.

In her forties she taught voice in New York City, endorsed by her old friend Caruso.

Personal life and legacy
Elena Bianchini-Cappelli died in 1919, at her villa in Rimini, aged 46 years.
There is a street named for Elena Bianchini-Cappelli in Rimini.

References

External links
 Elena Bianchini-Cappelli's page at La Voce Antica, including a chronology of her career. (In Italian)

1873 births
1919 deaths
Italian opera singers